David Finch is a former professional rugby league footballer who played in the 1970s and 1980s.

Playing career

County Cup Final appearances
David Finch played left-, i.e. number 11, and scored 2-goals in Castleford's 10-5 victory over Bradford Northern in the 1981 Yorkshire County Cup Final during the 1981–82 season at Headingley Rugby Stadium, Leeds, on Saturday 3 October 1981.

References

External links
Statistics at orl-heritagetrust.org.uk
David Finch Memory Box Search at archive.castigersheritage.com

Living people
Castleford Tigers players
English rugby league players
Oldham R.L.F.C. players
Place of birth missing (living people)
Rugby league centres
Rugby league locks
Rugby league second-rows
Rugby league wingers
Year of birth missing (living people)